Shalom Edri is an Israeli footballer who plays Maccabi Netanya.

Career
Edri started his career in Beitar Tubruk, and played three matches in the senior team. After short time, signed in Hapoel Ramat HaSharon. On 17 November 2012, Edri made his debut in the Israeli Premier League, in the 2–1 win against Maccabi Netanya.

On 27 October 2015, Edri signed in Maccabi Netanya, but after some months returned to Hapoel Ramat HaSharon.

On 29 August 2016, Edri signed in Hapoel Kfar Shalem.

On 6 July 2017, Edri signed in Ironi Tiberias.

On 10 October 2017, Edri signed in F.C. Tira.

On 1 July 2019, Edri returned to the Israeli Premier League when he signed in Beitar Jerusalem.

Career statistics

References

External links
 

1994 births
Living people
Israeli Jews
Israeli footballers
Beitar Nes Tubruk F.C. players
Hapoel Nir Ramat HaSharon F.C. players
Maccabi Netanya F.C. players
Hapoel Kfar Shalem F.C. players
F.C. Tzeirei Kafr Kanna players
Ironi Tiberias F.C. players
F.C. Tira players
Beitar Jerusalem F.C. players
Hapoel Hadera F.C. players
Hapoel Umm al-Fahm F.C. players
Liga Leumit players
Israeli Premier League players
Footballers from Netanya
Israeli people of Moroccan-Jewish descent
Association football midfielders